Villon is a French surname. Notable people with the surname include:

 François Villon (circa 1431–1463), French poet
 Jacques Villon (1875–1963), French painter
 Pierre Villon (1901–1980), French Communist Party member

See also
 Raymond Duchamp-Villon (1876–1918), French sculptor, brother of Jacques Villon